Mesorhizobium hawassense is a bacterium from the genus of Mesorhizobium which was isolated from root nodules.

References

External links
Type strain of Mesorhizobium hawassense at BacDive -  the Bacterial Diversity Metadatabase

Phyllobacteriaceae
Bacteria described in 2013